Roger Federer was the defending champion and won in the final 6–3, 6–3, 6–3 against Carlos Moyá.

Seeds

   Roger Federer (champion)
  Carlos Moyá (final)
  Jiří Novák (first round)
  Sjeng Schalken (second round)
  Agustín Calleri (second round, withdrew because of the flu)
  Tommy Robredo (first round)
  Nicolás Massú (first round)
  Albert Costa (second round)

Draw

Final

Section 1

Section 2

External links
 2003 CA-TennisTrophy draw

Vienna Open
2003 ATP Tour